The 2022–23 Liberty Flames basketball team represented Liberty University in the 2022–23 NCAA Division I men's basketball season. The Flames were led by Ritchie McKay in the eighth season of his current stint as head coach (10th overall). They played their home games at Liberty Arena in Lynchburg, Virginia as members of the ASUN Conference.

They finished the season 24–7, 15–2 in 2022–23 ASUN Play to tie for first place in conference standings. They defeated Bellarmine and Eastern Kentucky before losing to Kennesaw State in the champion title match in the ASUN tournament. They received an automatic bid to the NIT tournament where they defeated Villanova in the first round before losing to Wisconsin in the second round.

Previous season
The Flames finished the 2021–22 season 22–11, 12–4 in ASUN play to finish in first place in the East Division. They defeated Lipscomb in the quarterfinals of the ASUN tournament, before falling to Bellarmine in the semifinals.

Roster

Schedule and results

|-
!colspan=12 style=| Non-conference regular season

|-
!colspan=12 style=| ASUN Conference regular season

|-
!colspan=12 style=| ASUN tournament

|-
!colspan=12 style=| NIT

Sources

References

Liberty Flames basketball seasons
Liberty
Liberty Flames basketball team
Liberty Flames basketball team
Liberty